The Olivarez College (Filipino: Dalubhasaang Olivarez, also known as simply Olivarez or OC) is a private, nonsectarian college along Dr. A. Santos Avenue, Parañaque, Philippines that offers academic programs in the basic education, junior and high school, undergraduate, graduate and technical education levels. Founded in 1976, Olivarez College is the only school in Parañaque City that is accredited by the Philippine Accrediting Association of Schools, Colleges and Universities (PAASCU) and the Philippine Association of Colleges and Universities - Commission on Accreditation (PACUCOA). It is a member of the Universities and Colleges Athletic Association (UCAA) and National Capital Region Athletic Association (NCRAA).

History

Early history 
Dr. Pablo Olivarez and his wife, the late Dr. Rosario de Leon-Olivarez, pioneered in the development of the community when they put up Olivarez General Hospital in 1975. Being medical practitioners, they established the Olivarez School of Nursing on April 30, 1976.

In 1978, Olivarez School of Nursing was changed to Olivarez Junior College: instituting the College of Liberal Arts (now College of Arts and Sciences), College of Commerce (now College of Business Administration), and Health Related Courses (now College of Health Related Sciences).

In 1980, the school became Olivarez College and began offering Graduate School programs in 1992. In 1993, Liberal Arts, Commerce and Nursing programs were granted Level II accreditation status by the PACUCOA. Likewise, the Basic Education Department was awarded PAASCU level I status in February 2002 and level II accreditation status on May 14, 2004.

In 2003, the Board of Trustees decided to start a campus in Tagaytay offering the courses BS Nursing, BS Business Administration major in Marketing Management, Bachelor in Elementary Education major in Early Childhood, BS Hotel and Restaurant Management, BS Information Technology, BS Accountancy, Short Courses like Associate in Computer Technology, Associate in Health Science Education and Caregiver.

Near cancellation to present 
In 2013, the Commission on Higher Education (CHED) almost closed Olivarez's School of Nursing due to its low performance in its nursing licensure examinations. The college said in a statement that this was "politically motivated and candidly baseless".

At present, the school administrators are working toward making Olivarez College achieve university status, in accordance to the vision of the founder and president of the school, Pablo Olivarez.

Parañaque Campus

Main Buildings 
The Pablo R. Olivarez Hall houses the College Office of Student Affairs (OSA), which handles student programs and concerns, the Guidance and Testing Center (GTC), school clinic, audio-visual room, auditorium, botanical garden, nursing arts laboratories, and speech laboratories. Adjacent to this hall is the bookstore. The Rosario L. Olivarez Hall meanwhile is where the Integrated Basic Education Department (IBED) OSA head holds office, and has computer laboratories for IBED students. There is also the Saturnina de Leon Hall, which has computer libraries for senior high students. Each hall contains a library.

Olivarez Coliseum 
Situated near the Rosario L. Olivarez Hall (IBED Building), the Olivarez Coliseum can hold 5,000 spectators. It is not just the home of the Olivarez Sea Lions, but was also the home arena for the Asean Basketball League (ABL) team Alab Pilipinas and is currently the home arena of the Parañaque Patriots. It has also hosted UCBL games, and PBA games. Other non sport-related events the coliseum had hosted include pageants, campaign rallies, and more.

Sports Facilities 
Located beside the Saturnina De Leon Hall (formerly HRM building), the gymnasium features a basketball court which can be converted to several playing courts for volleyball, badminton, and other sports and it can accommodate 2,000 spectators. It was the home arena of the ABL team San Miguel Beermen. It has also hosted UCBL games,  and MPBL games,

Located beside the Olivarez Coliseum is a half-Olympic size swimming pool. They also have tennis courts, which host UAAP tennis matches.

Filming 
The Parañaque campus was among the filming locations for the 2011 film Way Back Home.

Academics

Program Offerings 
GRADUATE SCHOOL
Doctor in Business Administration (DBA)
Master in Business Administration (MBA)*
Master in Public Administration (MPA)
Master of Arts in Education (MAEd) major in Educational Management*
Master of Arts in Education (MAEd) major in Guidance and Counseling*

COLLEGE OF CRIMINOLOGY, ARTS and SCIENCES
Bachelor of Science in Criminology (BSC)
Bachelor of Library and information Science (BLIS)
Bachelor of Arts in Communication (ABComm)*
Bachelor of Arts major in Psychology (ABPsy)*
Bachelor of Arts major in Politicam Science (ABPolSci)*

COLLEGE OF EDUCATION
Bachelor of Elementary Education (BEEd)*
Bachelor of Early Childhood Education (BECEd)
Bachelor of Physical Education (BPEd)
Bachelor of Secondary Education (BSEd) major in English*
Bachelor of Secondary Education (BSEd) major in Filipino*
Teacher Certificate Program

COLLEGE OF BUSINESS AND ACCOUNTANCY
Bachelor of Science in Accountancy (BSA)
Bachelor of Science in Internal Audit (BSIA)
Bachelor of Science in Business Administration major in Marketing Management (BSBA-MM)*
Bachelor of Science in Business Administration major in Operations Management (BSBA-OM)*
Bachelor of Science in Customs Administration (BSCA)

COLLEGE OF TOURISM AND HOSPITALITY MANAGEMENT
Bachelor of Science in Hospitality Management (BSHM)*
Bachelor of Science in Tourism Management (BSTM)

COLLEGE OF COMPUTER STUDIES
Bachelor of Science in Computer Science (BSCS)
Bachelor of Science in Information Technology (BSIT)
Associate in Computer Technician (ACT)

COLLEGE OF HEALTH SCIENCES EDUCATION (CHSE)
Bachelor of Science in Nursing (BSN)*
Bachelor of Science in Radiologic Technology (BSRT)
Bachelor of Science in Physical Therapy (BSPT)
Bachelor of Science in Midwifery (BSM)

TESDA COURSES
Caregiving NC II
Contact Center Service NC II

INTEGRATED BASIC EDUCATION DEPARTMENT
Pre School
Grade School*
Junior High School*
Senior High School

(*)PAASCU/PACUCOA Accredited

Collaborations 
OC collaborates with:

 Esa Unggul University

Athletics 
Olivarez College is a member of the National Capital Region Athletic Association (NCRAA). It is one of the founding members of the Universities and Colleges Athletic Association (UCAA).

Their basketball team, the Olivarez Sea Lions, has won the National Capital Region Athletic Association (NCRAA) men's basketball title in 2010, 2013, and 2018. Chris Lalata, an alumnus of Olivarez, was drafted in the second round in the PBA Season 47 draft.

Notable alumni
Edwin Olivarez - Representative and former Mayor of Parañaque City
Sunday Salvacion - PBA Player
Janna Dominguez - Actress
Karen Gallman - Miss Intercontinental 2018
Lloyd Cafe Cadena - Author, vlogger, YouTuber

References

External links
website of Olivarez College Parañaque

Education in Parañaque
Education in Tagaytay
Universities and colleges in Metro Manila
Universities and colleges in Cavite